Set the World on Fire is the third studio album by Canadian heavy metal band Annihilator, released on May 4, 1993 by Roadrunner and Epic Records. The album received mixed reviews, toning down the thrash elements of Alice in Hell and Never, Neverland in favor of a more radio friendly sound. The title track, "Knight Jumps Queen", and "Brain Dance" are still setlist regulars, becoming fan favourites years after the release of the album.

The album was successful in Europe (charting at No. 79 in the German charts) and Asia (charting at No. 47 in Japan)  but failed to break America – leading to the band (along with many others) being dropped from Roadrunner in 1993. Bassist Wayne Darley left the band shortly after, as he was not able to enter Japan on tour in support of the album. The album was reissued in 2009.

Track listing

Credits 
Band members
Aaron Randall – vocals
Jeff Waters – guitars, bass, producer, mixing at Little Mountain Sound Studios, Vancouver
Neil Goldberg – guitar, bass on "Don't Bother Me"
Wayne Darley – bass (not on the album)
Mike Mangini – drums on tracks 1–3, 6, 8–10

Additional musicians
Ray Hartmann – drums on "Snake in the Grass" and "Sounds Good to Me"
Rick Fedyk – drums on "Phoenix Rising"
John Webster – keyboards on "Phoenix Rising"
Mark Lafrance, David Steele – backing vocals on "Phoenix Rising"
Norm Gordon – backing vocals on "Brain Dance"
Coburn Pharr – lyrics
The Annihilettes – backing vocals on "Knight Jumps Queen" and "Brain Dance"

Production
Paul Blake – engineer, mixing
Max Norman, Bill Buckingham, Steve Royea – engineers
Randy Staub – mixing of "Phoenix Rising" at Warehouse Studios, Vancouver
Eddy Screyer – mastering at Future Disc, Hollywood, California

Charts

References 

1993 albums
Annihilator (band) albums
Roadrunner Records albums
Epic Records albums